Burg Hardegg is a castle in Lower Austria, Austria. It was restored in the late 19th century with the help of architect Carl Gangolf Kayser.

See also
List of castles in Austria

References

This article was initially translated from the German Wikipedia.

Castles in Lower Austria